McElhanney Ltd. is a Western Canadian-based consulting firm that provides engineering, geomatics (surveying and mapping), geospatial, environmental, planning, and landscape architecture services. In operation since 1910, it is the oldest employee-owned engineering and geomatics firm in Canada, with its corporate headquarters in Vancouver, British Columbia. The company comprises over 1,000 employees based in over 25 locations across Western Canada and offices in Newfoundland and Labrador and Florida (USA) and serves cities, communities and parks, energy and resources, and transportation market sectors.

History
The company was founded in 1910 by William Gordon McElhanney who surveyed the wilds outside burgeoning Vancouver. 
Between the 1920s to 1950s, the company saw success through significant projects such as the Lions Gate Bridge Alignment, Trans Mountain Pipeline, Kemano Tunnel Surveys & Hydro Power Tunnel, and the Stewart-Cassiar Highway projects, while navigating through hardship during the Great Depression (1929 to 1939). W.G. McElhanney retired in 1956, following completion of the firm's first international project, Survey of the Mekong River.

Following W.G. McElhanney's departure and after navigating through four more recessions (1980 to 1982, 1991, 2008, 2014), the firm split into three sister companies known as McElhanney Consulting Services Ltd. (MCSL), McElhanney Legal Survey Limited (MLSL), and GeoSurveys in 1987. 

MCSL continued to operate mainly as an engineering and geomatics firm serving the energy, transportation, and municipal markets throughout BC and in parts of Western Canada. MLSL operated mainly as a geomatics firm serving oil and gas clients in Alberta. MLSL changed its name to McElhanney Geomatics Engineering Ltd. (MGEL) in 2018. GeoSurveys closed in 1994.

Acquisition
McElhanney Ltd. was established in 2019, by an amalgamation between sister companies, McElhanney Geomatics Engineering Ltd. and McElhanney Consulting Services Ltd., which were separate companies since 1987.

About
McElhanney Ltd. is the primary operating company, and is a wholly owned subsidiary of The McElhanney Group Ltd. The company is employee-owned, with subsidiary companies.

References
Gordon, Katherine, Maps, Mountains and Mosquitoes: The McElhanney Story, 2009, McElhanney Group, Limited, First Edition (Jan. 1 2009).

External links
Official Website

Companies based in Vancouver
Construction and civil engineering companies of Canada
Construction and civil engineering companies established in 1910
Canadian companies established in 1910